Robert Thompson is a poker official from Las Vegas. He served as the tournament director on Celebrity Poker Showdown. Phil Gordon said on one broadcast that Thompson is one of the best tournament directors in Las Vegas.  His distinctive way of saying the tournament opener "shuffle up and deal" has become something of a catchphrase for fans of the show.

Thompson was the tournament director for Hollywood Park Casino in Los Angeles, California from 1997 to 2004. He is the son of Bob Thompson, a former tournament director of the World Series of Poker.

Notes

External links

American poker players
Poker tournament directors
Living people
Year of birth missing (living people)